Sønnen fra Amerika is a 1957 Danish family film directed by Jon Iversen and starring Peter Malberg.

Cast
Peter Malberg as Niels 'Pind' Nielsen
Poul Reichhardt as Jens Nielsen
Emil Hass Christensen as Squier Karl Kristian Duue
Lisbeth Movin as Ingrid
Sigrid Horne-Rasmussen as Mine Holm
Kjeld Petersen as The Vet
Holger Juul Hansen as Teacher Jesper Jensen
Anna Hagen as Mads
Preben Kaas as Preben
Louis Miehe-Renard as Under Manager Palle Reamussen
Knud Heglund as Grocer Peter Mikkelsen
Helga Frier as Alma Mikkelsen
Vera Tørresø as Lise Mikkelsen
Poul Petersen as Lawyer Viggo Lange
Preben Lerdorff Rye as A Worker
Henry Nielsen as Member of the Parish Council
Bjørn Puggaard-Müller as Antique dealer Sejersen
Lise Thomsen as Daughter at inn
Henry Lohmann as Waiter at inn
Marie Brink as Karen
Carl Ottosen

References

External links

1957 films
Danish children's films
1950s Danish-language films
Films directed by Jon Iversen
ASA Filmudlejning films